
De Boer is a Dutch occupational surname meaning "the farmer". Variant spellings include den Boer and DeBoer. Notable people with this surname include:

De Boer / DeBoer

A
Ad de Boer (born 1946), Dutch politician and journalist
Alan DeBoer (born 1950/51), American businessman and Oregon politician
Ale de Boer (born 1987), Dutch footballer
Alice de Boer (1872 - 1955), medical doctor in Sri Lanka
Arthur DeBoer (1917–2007), American cardiologist

B
Betty de Boer (born 1971), Dutch politician
Brent DeBoer, American singer-songwriter of The Dandy Warhols

C
Cherie de Boer (born 1951), Dutch accordionist
Christine de Boer (born 1983), Dutch comedy musician and cabaret performer

E
Erik-Jan de Boer (born 1967), Dutch animation director

F
Frank de Boer (born 1970), Dutch football defender and manager, twin brother of Ronald
Fredrik deBoer, American academic

G

H
Hannes de Boer (1899–1982), Dutch long jumper
Hans de Boer (born 1937), Dutch politician and State Secretary
Harry DeBoer (1903–1992), American labor activist
Henry Speldewinde de Boer (1896–1957), Ceylonese British-colonial doctor
Herman Pieter de Boer (1928–2014), Dutch writer, journalist and lyricist

J
Jan de Boer (gymnast) (1859-1941), Dutch gymnast
Jan de Boer (footballer, born 1898) (1898-1988), Dutch football goalkeeper
Jan de Boer (physicist) (born 1967), Dutch physicist
Jan Hendrik de Boer (1899–1971), Dutch physicist and chemist
Jelle Taeke de Boer (1908–1970), Dutch art collector
Johanna de Boer (1901–1984), Dutch fencer

K
Kalen DeBoer (born 1973/74), American football coach and player
Kito de Boer (born 1957), Dutch businessman and art collector
Klaas de Boer (born 1942), Dutch-born U.S. soccer player and coach

L
Leo de Boer (born 1953), Dutch film director
Lieuwe de Boer (born 1951), Dutch speed skater
Linda de Boer (born 1954), Dutch swimmer

M
Manon de Boer (born 1966), Dutch video artist
Margreeth de Boer (born 1939), Dutch politician
Marloes de Boer (born 1982), Dutch football defender
Matt de Boer (born 1990), Australian rules footballer
Maud de Boer-Buquicchio (born 1944), Dutch jurist 
Mickey de Boer, Dutch international cricketer
Mieke de Boer (born 1980), Dutch darts player

N
Nicole de Boer (born 1970), Canadian actress

P
Peter DeBoer (born 1968), Canadian hockey player and coach
Peter de Boer (born 1971), Scotland-born New Zealand curler
Piet de Boer (1919–1984), Dutch football forward

R
Remmelt de Boer (born 1942), Dutch educator and politician
René de Boer (born 1945), Dutch sculptor
Rob DeBoer (born 1971), Canadian electro-jazz composer and musician
Rody de Boer (born 1997), Dutch football goalkeeper
Roelf de Boer (born 1949), Dutch politician
Ronald de Boer (born 1970), Dutch football midfielder, twin brother of Frank
Rudolf de Boer (1444–1485), Dutch humanist better known as Agricola

S
Saco Rienk de Boer (1883–1974), Dutch architect
Sophie de Boer (born 1990), Dutch racing cyclist

T
Ted de Boer (born 1943), Dutch law scholar
Teuntje de Boer (born 1968), Dutch cricketer
Tobias de Boer (1930–2016), Dutch mechanical engineer

W
Wendy DeBoer (born 1974), American Nebraska politician
Wubbo de Boer (1948-2017), Dutch civil servant

Y
Yoann de Boer (born 1982), Dutch football midfielder
Yvo de Boer (born 1954), Dutch diplomat and environmentalist

Den Boer
Aart den Boer (1852–1941), Dutch architect and contractor
Godfried van den Boer (1934–2012), Belgian footballer 
Jan den Boer (1889–1944), Dutch water polo player
Nick DenBoer (born 1979), Canadian director
Ruben Den Boer (born 1992), Dutch DJ and music producer

See also
De Boor (disambiguation)
Boer (surname)

Dutch-language surnames
Occupational surnames